John Grodzicki (February 26, 1917 – May 2, 1998) was an American Major League Baseball pitcher. A native of Nanticoke, Pennsylvania, he pitched for the St. Louis Cardinals in 1941, 1946 and 1947.

A top pitching prospect before the outbreak of World War II, Grodzicki would pitch in 24 games (23 in a relief role) for the Cardinals, winning 2 and losing 2, with an earned run average of 4.43. He allowed 31 hits and 34 bases on balls in 40 MLB innings pitched, with 20 strikeouts.

Grodzicki's baseball career was interrupted by four years of military service. He served in the United States Army's 17th Airborne Division and became a paratrooper. In combat in Germany on March 29, 1945, Grodzicki sustained shrapnel wounds to both legs. He was awarded a Purple Heart, and required surgery and extensive rehabilitation to resume his baseball career after the war's end.

Grodzicki's professional playing career — spent entirely in the Cardinal organization — stretched from 1936 through 1952, including 11 years in minor league baseball. He later managed in the Redbird farm system, scouted for the Cardinals, then became a minor league instructor for the Detroit Tigers for over a dozen years. He then spent a season (1979) as the Tigers' MLB pitching coach. He died at age 81 in Daytona Beach, Florida.

References

External links

1917 births
1998 deaths
Baseball coaches from Pennsylvania
Baseball players from Pennsylvania
Columbus Red Birds players
Detroit Tigers coaches
Geneva Red Birds players
Houston Buffaloes players
Major League Baseball pitchers
Major League Baseball pitching coaches
Military personnel from Pennsylvania
Minor league baseball managers
New Iberia Cardinals players
Omaha Cardinals players
Paratroopers
People from Nanticoke, Pennsylvania
Rochester Red Wings players
St. Louis Cardinals players
St. Louis Cardinals scouts
Winston-Salem Cardinals players
United States Army personnel of World War II
United States Army soldiers